Daiva Dasakam (Ten Verses To God: The Universal Prayer) is a prayer penned by Narayana Guru circa 1914. In 2009 the Kerala state government recommended that it should become the national prayer of India. It has been translated into at least 100 languages and scripts.

Text
ദൈവമേ! കാത്തുകൊള്‍കങ്ങു

കൈവിടാതിങ്ങു ഞങ്ങളേ;

നാവികന്‍ നീ ഭവാബ്ധിക്കോ‌-

രാവിവന്‍തോണി നിന്‍പദം.

ഒന്നൊന്നായെണ്ണിയെണ്ണി ത്തൊ-

ട്ടെണ്ണും പൊരുളൊടുങ്ങിയാല്‍

നിന്നിടും ദൃക്കുപോലുള്ളം

നിന്നിലസ്‌പന്ദമാകണം.

അന്നവസ്ത്രാദി മുട്ടാതെ

തന്നു രക്ഷിച്ചു ഞങ്ങളെ

ധന്യരാക്കുന്ന നീയൊന്നു-

തന്നെ ഞങ്ങള്‍ക്കു തമ്പുരാന്‍.

ആഴിയും തിരയും കാറ്റും-

ആഴവും പോലെ ഞങ്ങളും

മായയും നിന്‍ മഹിമയും

നീയുമെന്നുള്ളിലാകണം.

നീയല്ലോ സൃഷ്ടിയും സൃഷ്ടാ-

വായതും സൃഷ്ടിജാലവും

നീയല്ലോ ദൈവമേ,സൃഷ്ടി-

യ്ക്കുള്ള സാമഗ്രിയായതും

നീയല്ലോ മായയും മായാ-

വിയും മായാവിനോദനും

നീയല്ലോ മായയെനീക്കി -

സ്സായൂജ്യം നല്‍കുമാര്യനും.

നീ സത്യം ജ്ഞാനമാനന്ദം

നീ തന്നെ വര്‍ത്തമാനവും

ഭൂതവും ഭാവിയും വേറ-

ല്ലോതും മൊഴിയുമോര്‍ക്കില്‍ നീ.

അകവും പുറവും തിങ്ങും

മഹിമാവാര്‍ന്ന നിന്‍ പദം

പുകഴ്ത്തുന്നൂ ഞങ്ങളങ്ങു

ഭഗവാനേ, ജയിയ്ക്കുക.

ജയിയ്ക്കുക മഹാദേവ,

ദീനവന പരായണാ,

ജയിയ്ക്കുക ചിദാനന്ദ,

ദയാസിന്ധോ ജയിയ്ക്കുക.

ആഴമേറും നിന്‍ മഹസ്സാ-

മാഴിയില്‍ ഞങ്ങളാകവേ

ആഴണം വാഴണം നിത്യം

വാഴണം വാഴണം സുഖം.

References

External links
This prayer is a composition of Sree Narayana Guru
DAIVA DASAKAM IN HINDI

Hindu devotional texts
Hinduism in Kerala